Jade Mountain is a mountain in the North Slope Borough, Alaska located  southwest of Toolik Lake on Alaska State land. The name refers to the color of the moss-covered tundra around the summit. 

It is a popular hike for researchers at the Toolik Lake Field Station.

References

Mountains of North Slope Borough, Alaska